Diane Peoples Waldrop (née Ray; September 1, 1945 – March 14, 2020) was an American pop and rock and roll singer of the early 1960s. Ray was born in Gastonia, North Carolina. Her musical career began after she won a talent contest on Big WAYS radio in Charlotte NC. She is best known for her hit single, "Please Don't Talk to the Lifeguard", which reached #31 on the Billboard Hot 100 chart in 1963. Without any further chart presence, Ray remains a one-hit wonder.

Diane Ray Waldrop died on March 14, 2020, at the age of 74.

Discography

Album

Singles

References

External links
Article on Diane Ray and Diane Renay

1945 births
2020 deaths
American women pop singers
Mercury Records artists
People from Gastonia, North Carolina
Singers from North Carolina
21st-century American women